Geobacter bemidjiensis is a Fe(III)-reducing bacteria. It is Gram-negative, slightly curved rod-shaped and is motile via means of monotrichous flagella. Its type strain is BemT (=ATCC BAA-1014T =DSM 16622T =JCM 12645T).

See also 
 List of bacterial orders
 List of bacteria genera

References

Further reading

External links

LPSN
Type strain of Geobacter bemidjiensis at BacDive -  the Bacterial Diversity Metadatabase

Bacteria described in 2005
Thermodesulfobacteriota